Zeyxuroba (also, Xanoba, Khanoba, and Zeykhuroba) is a village in the Khachmaz Rayon of Azerbaijan.  The village forms part of the municipality of Yalama. The postal code is AZ 2730.

References 

Populated places in Khachmaz District